
Gmina Mucharz is a rural gmina (administrative district) in Wadowice County, Lesser Poland Voivodeship, in southern Poland.

Villages
Gmina Mucharz contains the villages and settlements of Jamnik, Jaszczurowa, Koziniec, Mucharz, Skawce, Świnna Poręba and Zagórze.

Neighbouring gminas
Gmina Mucharz is bordered by the gminas of Stryszów, Wadowice and Zembrzyce.

References
Polish official population figures 2006

Mucharz
Wadowice County